Emily Nanziri (born 25 November 1987) is a Ugandan sprinter competing primarily in the 400 metres. She represented her country at three consecutive Commonwealth Games, starting in 2010.

International competitions

1Disqualified in the final

Personal bests
Outdoor
200 metres – 24.15 (Nairobi 2011)
400 metres – 53.30 (Kampala 2014)
800 metres – 2:09.71 (Kampala 2018)

References

1987 births
Living people
Ugandan female sprinters
Athletes (track and field) at the 2010 Commonwealth Games
Athletes (track and field) at the 2014 Commonwealth Games
Athletes (track and field) at the 2018 Commonwealth Games
Commonwealth Games competitors for Uganda
People from Luweero District
Athletes (track and field) at the 2019 African Games
African Games medalists for Uganda
African Games medalists in athletics (track and field)
20th-century Ugandan women
21st-century Ugandan women